Gori Muñoz (1906–1978) was a Spanish-born Argentine art director. He worked on many films including The Phantom Lady (1945).

Selected filmography
 The Phantom Lady (1945)
 The Three Rats (1946)
 The Sin of Julia (1946)
 The Beautiful Brummel (1951)
 The Unwanted (1951)
 Don't Ever Open That Door (1952)
 Spring of Life (1957)
 Había una vez un circo (1972)

References

Bibliography
 Rist, Peter H. & Barnard, Timothy. South American Cinema: A Critical Filmography, 1915-1994 Routledge, 2013.

External links

1906 births
1978 deaths
Spanish art directors
Argentine art directors
Spanish emigrants to Argentina
People from Valencia